Tobias Nipkow (born 1958) is a German computer scientist.

Career
Nipkow received his Diplom (MSc) in computer science from the Department of Computer Science of the Technische Hochschule Darmstadt in 1982, and his Ph.D. from the University of Manchester in 1987.

He worked at MIT from 1987, changed to Cambridge University in 1989, and to Technical University Munich in 1992, where he was appointed professor for programming theory.

He is chair of the Logic and Verification group since 2011.

He is known for his work in interactive and automatic theorem proving, in particular for the Isabelle proof assistant; he was the editor of the Journal of Automated Reasoning up to January 1, 2021. Moreover, he focuses on programming language semantics, type systems and functional programming.

In 2021 he won the Herbrand Award "in recognition of his leadership in developing Isabelle and related tools, resulting in key contributions to the foundations, automation, and use of proof assistants in a wide range of applications, as well as his successful efforts in increasing the visibility of automated reasoning".

Selected publications

References

External links
 Home page

German computer scientists
Theoretical computer scientists
Academic staff of the Technical University of Munich
1958 births
Living people
Technische Universität Darmstadt alumni